FAW or Faw can refer to:

 Football Association of Wales, the third-oldest national association in the world
 Fellowship of Australian Writers, an Australian lobbying group
 FAW Group, a Chinese automotive manufacturing company
 Al-Faw Peninsula, a marshy region adjoining the Persian Gulf
 Al-Faw, a small port town in Iraq
 Al-Faw Palace, a palace in Baghdad
 Fall armyworm, an American food pest, now spreading in Southern Africa
 Fleet Air Wing, see Patrol Wing (United States Navy)